Kenny "Dope" Gonzalez (born July 5, 1970), also sometimes known as K-Dope, is an American record producer and disc jockey. He is one half of the classic house music Masters at Work musical production team with Little Louie Vega;  and also released the hit "The Bomb! (These Sounds Fall into My Mind)" as The Bucketheads. He has been referred to as one of the most prolific artists of the modern music age.

Biography
Gonzalez started his DJ career in 1985 organizing neighborhood block parties in his home of Brooklyn, New York, with his then musical partner, Mike Delgado. Under the Masters at Work moniker, the parties became quite successful and attracted Todd Terry who later borrowed the group's name for two record releases. Terry returned the favor at a later date when he loaned Gonzalez a drum machine, which began his interest in producing beats. Kenny Dope was one of the DJs for the group KAOS whose 1988 album Court's In Session featured production by Todd Terry.

Discography
see Masters at Work for his discography with the group.

Albums
1988 Court's In Session (as a member of the group "KAOS")
1992 The Kenny Dope Unreleased Project
1995 The Best of Dopewax Records - The Dope Stuff
1995 All in the Mind, as The Bucketheads
2001 Supa-Dope Classics Volume I
2001 Found Instrumentals
2005 Found Instrumentals Vol. 2
2011 "Future Before Nostalgia" (Kenny Dope Presents....Rasheed Chappell)

Singles
Kenny "Dope" Gonzalez/Kenny Dope
1990 "Total Maddness EP"
1991 "Blood Vibes EP"
1993 "Phat Beats EP"
1993 "The Unreleased Project EP"
1994 "Boomin' in Ya Jeep" (with Screechie Dan)
1994 "Axxis EP"
1994 "The Pushin' Dope EP"
1994 "All I'm Askin'"
1997 "Jam the Mace" (re-issue)
2000 "Brazilica"
2000 "Can You Handle It"
2000 "Buggin' on Percussion"
2000 "The Illout"
2001 "Could You be the One (Thank God it's Friday)" (with D.M.)
2001 "Comin' Inside"
2001 "House Brakes Vol. 1"
2003 "Frenzy"
2005 "House Brakes Vol. 2"
2005 "House Brakes Vol. 3"
2006 "Nitelife (Encore)" (with Kim English)
2011 "I Know" Rasheed Chappell (Future Before Nostalgia)
2011 "What I'm Here 4" Rasheed Chappell (Future Before Nostalgia)
2011 "Stay Sharp" Rasheed Chappell (Future before Nostalgia)

Power House
1989 "Power House 1 EP"
1990 "Power House 2 EP - Kenny's Jazz"
1991 "Power House 3 EP - Makin' a Livin'"

The Bucketheads
1994 "Whew"
1995 "The Bomb! (These Sounds Fall into My Mind)"
1995 "Come and Be Gone"
1995 "Got Myself Together"
1995 "The Dungeon Tapes EP"
1995 "Time and Space"
2000 "The Bomb (2000 Remixes)"

The Untouchables
1991 "The Untouchables EP"
1991 "The Swing Doctor EP"
1991 "Take a Chance"
1993 "Go Bah"
1994 "Just the Way You Want"

Liquid Dope
1997 "Rock Your EP"
1999 "Terra-Humara"
2004 "Dope Goes Back"
2005 "Oh My God/Krash"
2006 "I Want You" (with Raheem DeVaughn)

The Madd Racket
1991 "Supa"
1993 "Donndadda/Rama Jama"
2001 "Madd Racket EP Part 1"
2006 "Makin' a Livin'/Get It (Good God!)"

Total Ka-Os
1991 "My Love/Get On Up"
1994 "It's an Ill Groove"
1994 "Something Old Skool"

Other aliases
1989 "House Syndicate EP", as House Syndicate
1989 "Messiah/Insane", as NMC & ADJ (with Mike Delgado and Tommy Musto)
1990 "Jam the Mace EP", as House Syndicate
1990 "A Touch of Salsa", as 2 Dope
1991 "Just Me & You/Battlestar Gallactica", as Kenny's House
1991 "Yeah/Good Feelin'", as Swing Kids
1992 "Axxis", as Axxis
1992 "Gunshot", as The Unreleased Project (with Todd Terry and Shaggy)
1994 "Love Is What We Need", as The Dream Team (with Todd Terry, Roger Sanchez and Benji Candelario)
1996 "Bucketbootleg", as K-Dope
1997 "And There Ain't", as DBX
1999 "Strictly Rhythms Volume I", as K-Dope
2001 "A Madd Cry", as House Brigade
2003 "I Got Rhythm", as Soul Fuzion (with Vee and Luisito Quintero)
2006 "They Can't Stop It", as Black Roots
2007 "Get Down", as Todd Terry All-Stars (with Todd Terry, DJ Sneak, Terry Hunter and Tara McDonald)

References

External links

1970 births
Club DJs
Electronic dance music DJs
DJs from New York City
Remixers
American dance musicians
American house musicians
Living people
Deep house musicians
Positiva Records artists